Sky and Earth Has Affection (also known as World Affectionate or Love & Affection) is a Taiwanese television series. It aired from July 22, 2003 to February 24, 2004. It showed on SET Taiwanevery weeknight from 8pm to 9:30pm.

Cast
Louis Hsiao as Chiang Sheng-huang
Eric Huang as Chiang/Huang Tianlin
Royce Wong as Chiang Qingwen
Jeannie Hsieh as Chiang Qingxia
Alex Ko as Shi Zhengjie
Miao Ke-li as Wu Ruiying
Fon Cin as Lin Xinlan
Athena Lee as Liu/Chen Qiao-an
Rex Kao as Shi Zhengbang
Lin Zhengtian as Shi Quangun
Hu Hongda as Shi Guo-qin
Yang Huaimin as Huang Kun-nan
Li Huiying as Zhou Xiu-fang

Broadcast

Overseas
The show has been introduced to Mainland China, in 2007 during the Chinese New Year, China Central Television dubbed the show in Mandarin, airing February 16, 2007 to July 31, 2007 at 4:47pm with a total of 165 episodes.
The show has also been dubbed to Vietnamese which aired on Echannel (VTVCab5) which aired from February 24, 2016 to September 1, 2016, at 4:55pm, with a total of 192 episodes which were dubbed from the rerun version of the show.

Re-run
The drama re-broadcast on SET Taiwan from May 11, 2004, to April 1, 2005, at Monday to Friday at 5pm – 6pm, with a total of 180 episodes.

References

Sanlih E-Television original programming
Taiwanese drama television series
2003 Taiwanese television series debuts
2004 Taiwanese television series endings
Hokkien-language television shows